Shri Samarth High School is a school in Amravati, Maharashtra, India. At the entrance there is a big statue of Samarth Ramdas, a prominent Marathi saint who guided Shivaji. The institute was created in their names.

History
Earlier it was at a place near the heart of the city. Later a new building was constructed. For a few years both the premises were operative. Later all the classes were merged to the new building.

Shri Samarth Education Society was established in July 1934. The founder members were S.K. Karmarkar, D.R. Kaloti, B. J. Kane, Dr. V.K. Kolwadkar, Adv. Balasahib Hirurkar, Adv. V.B. Brahma, N.T. Rajderkar, H.A. Asnare, K.R. Pande Shri and R.H. Deodhar.

The founder headmaster was Shri B.J. Kane, followed by N.T. Rajderkar from 1947 to 1978, who was the main architect of overall development of the school. He retired as headmaster in 1978.

International/national renowned flautist Prashant Agnihotri was a student at Samantha High School 1980 to 1987.

Other schools
The school includes "Shri Samarth Secondary and Higher Secondary School" and "Shri Samarth Junior College". These institutions are run by Shri Samarth Education Society Amravati. High school has classes from 5th to 10th standard and junior college has 11th and 12th standard.

External links
School website
Facebook page

Education in Amravati
High schools and secondary schools in Maharashtra